Saleem Malik (born 16 April 1963), is a Pakistani former cricketer.  He played for the Pakistan national cricket team between 1981/82 and 1999, at one stage captaining the side. He was a right-handed wristy middle order batsman who was strong square of the wicket. His off break bowling was also quite effective. Despite playing more than 100 Tests he would go down in cricket history as the first of a number of international cricketers to be banned for match fixing around the start of the 21st century. Saleem is the brother-in-law of former teammate Ijaz Ahmed.

He captained Pakistan in 12 Tests, winning 7.  In One-Day International cricket he led his country 34 times, winning 21 of matches.

International career

Malik played his first Test match in March 1982, against Sri Lanka at Karachi. After making 12 in his first innings he made an unbeaten 100 in the second to set up a declaration. Aged 18 years and 323 days he was at the time the second youngest player to make a century on Test debut.

During the tour of England in 1987, Malik fell for 99 at Headingley and made 102 at The Oval. He would become familiar with English conditions, playing for Essex for a couple of years during the early 1990s. He had a good season in 1991, scoring 1972 runs, the 3rd most by a non-English player for Essex.
In Test cricket he performed better against England than any other of his opponents, appearing 19 times and making 1396 runs at 60.70.

One of his notable performances in One Day International cricket was an innings that he played against India in 1987. Chasing 238 in 40 overs, Pakistan were reduced to 5/161 when Saleem arrived at the crease. He scored 72 out of the remaining 77 runs required, making them from just 36 deliveries. He finished unbeaten and Pakistan won by 2 wickets with 3 balls still to spare in the match.

Match fixing
Malik captained Pakistan in tours of South Africa and Zimbabwe before being suspended from cricket having been accused of bribery. He was however found innocent and allowed to continue his career. Malik played his last Test match in January 1999 but ended his cricket career in disgrace, having been given a life ban as a result of Justice Qayyam's enquiry in May 2000.

A local court in Lahore lifted the life ban imposed by the Pakistan Cricket Board on 23 October 2008. Civil judge Malik Mohammad Altaf ruled in favour of Malik and quashed the ban imposed for alleged match fixing.

He claimed to have accepted an offer by the PCB to work as the Chief Coach for country's National Cricket Academy on 3 November 2008 just days after the ban was lifted, however, the PCB denied making any such offer.

In October 2012, Saleem Malik submitted his application to the Pakistan Cricket Board (PCB) for the position of batting coach. Earlier that month the PCB had placed an advertisement seeking a batting coach for the national side. He is now planning to establish a cricket academy for young cricketers in Lahore and has been doing his personal business with his long-term partner, Hamza Yusuf.

See also
List of cricketers banned for match fixing

References

External links

Pakistan One Day International cricketers
Pakistan Test cricketers
Pakistani cricket captains
Cricketers who made a century on Test debut
Pakistan Test cricket captains
Cricketers at the 1987 Cricket World Cup
Cricketers at the 1992 Cricket World Cup
Cricketers at the 1996 Cricket World Cup
Cricketers at the 1999 Cricket World Cup
Essex cricketers
Habib Bank Limited cricketers
Sargodha cricketers
Wisden Cricketers of the Year
1963 births
Living people
Pakistani cricketers
Lahore City A cricketers
Cricketers from Lahore
Lahore City cricketers
Lahore City Whites cricketers
Cricketers banned for corruption
People from Lahore